Digitorum brevis muscle may refer to:

 Extensor digitorum brevis manus
 Extensor digitorum brevis muscle
 Flexor digitorum brevis muscle